Eva Charlotte Ellis Luckes   (8 July 1854 – 16 February 1919) was Matron of The London Hospital from 1880 to 1919.

Early life
Eva Abigail Charlotte Ellis Luckes (she herself spelled her name Lückes with the umlaut)
was born in Exeter, Devon on 8 July 1854 into an upper-middle-class family. Her father, Henry Richard Luckes, was a banker who had established a comfortable home for his family in Newnham, Gloucestershire. Miss Luckes, the eldest of three daughters, was educated at Malvern, Cheltenham College and Dresden. She suffered from some physical disablement and had a horse to help her travel about the countryside. After finishing her education she returned to Newnham and helped her mother run the house and visited the sick of the parish. It was this that developed her interest in nursing.

Early career
Luckes began her training in September 1876 when she entered the Middlesex Hospital as a paying probationer. Unfortunately, she left after three months, finding the work too strenuous. This did not prevent her from trying again and after a rest, she started at the Westminster Hospital, completing her training in August 1878. She was appointed night sister at the London Hospital, where she stayed for three months before becoming lady superintendent at the Manchester General Hospital for Sick Children in Pendlebury. She resigned from this post after apparently clashing with the medical committee for attempting to instigate reforms in the standard of nurse training.

The London

Application and appointment
After serving for a short period at the Hospital for Sick Children Great Ormond Street; (Great Ormond Street Hospital), Luckes successfully applied for the position of Matron at The London Hospital, where she had begun her professional career. At 26, Luckes was the youngest of the five candidates interviewed and several of the Committee thought her 'too young and too pretty' and were wary of appointing someone with relatively little experience. However, the confidence of the committee members was well founded as she set about introducing a programme of reforms to improve the standard of nursing at The London, although it should be remembered that a Sub-Committee, to review the system, had been appointed in the previous year.

While Luckes was not a "Nightingale nurse," in the sense of having trained at the Nightingale School at St Thomas', she sought advice on nursing and hospital problems from Nightingale. The two met periodically and Nightingale
in effect became her mentor, and then her active supporter when a House of Lords' committee was established to investigate charges against her. Nightingale worked strenuously behind the scenes to clear her name, notably
by eliciting the help of her cousin, General Sir Lothian Nicholson, who was a governor at the hospital. Luckes was cleared of all the charges.

She was a valued collaborator of Nightingale's in the campaign against the state registration of nurses led by Ethel Gordon Fenwick, on which see "State Registration of Nurses" (McDonald).

Luckes is given credit for the appointment of Sydney Holland to the London Hospital committee, where he later became treasurer and chair. He raised the money for a substantial hospital expansion, including a new nurses' home.
Luckes appreciated Nightingale's "patient, bright listening—there are as many differences in the ways of listening as in the ways of talking, are there not?" she remarked in a last letter: "I left your room yesterday
feeling so much better for having been with you," her anxieties "melting away," so that she could be "strong" again, and "see clearly the way to go".

Reforms
Luckes' reforms initiated in 1880 were built around a well established plan of what she wanted to achieve; before that date there were Probationers, but their training consisted simply of one year's work on the wards, after which they were considered to be trained nurses, without examination. They were then expected to undertake a further 2 years service. She ensured that nurses were better provided for by seeing that meals were provided and that better accommodation was available. After the reforms, it was established that a Probationer's training should last 2 years, the first year being concerned with theoretical knowledge and the second with practical skills. If successful in the examination at the end of this time, the qualified nurse was expected to serve for a further year. The training was later extended to 3 years and 1 year after qualification.  In 1884 a class of "Paying Probationers" – those who could afford to pay for their training – was introduced.

Training
The selection procedure for new nurses became more rigorous. After an application form had been filled in, there was a personal interview with Matron, a medical examination and a month's trial before being accepted as a probationer. Proper training was given, supplemented by lectures given by Luckes herself and a member of the medical staff. Proper examinations were introduced at the end of the training period. In 1895 the system of training was amended, by the introduction of a 7-week Preliminary Training Course at Tredegar House, devoted almost entirely to classroom learning, followed by an examination. In the summer of 1897 an epidemic of typhoid fever broke out in Maidstone and six of Luckes' Nurses were seconded to help, including Edith Cavell. Of the 1,700 who contracted the disease, only 132 died. In 1905 a department for the training of Pupil Midwives was established and was recognised by the Central Midwives Board in February 1906. She also improved the pay of her nurses and encouraged them to join the National Pension Scheme for Nurses that had been established.

Private Nursing Institution
In June 1885, Luckes introduced a Private Nursing Institution, which was established in January 1886, to provide trained nurses for private patients. The purpose of the system was twofold: to boost the reputation and finances of the Hospital and to keep the services of nurses who might otherwise leave.

Preliminary Training School – Tredegar House
Luckes introduced the Preliminary Training School in 1895 at Tredegar House. The original school was established in Bow, East London, in a Georgian property donated by Lord Tredegar.  New probationers could get a feel for the work before entering the wards. It was also a way for Matron to assess whether the prospective nurse was suitable or not. The Preliminary Training School was moved to a purpose built building constructed in 1911–12 by Architect and Hospital surveyor, Rowland Plumbe who himself donated £5,000 towards the cost of building work.  The second building was also known as Tredegar House.

State registration
Despite being busy with her reforms at the London, Luckes was fighting proposed reforms to the nursing profession as a whole. Correspondence was written at a turbulent time for Luckes and her contemporary, Florence Nightingale, with whom Luckes corresponded at least from 1891 – 1898. The British Nurses Association (BNA), founded in 1887, was campaigning vigorously for a statutory register of trained nurses as a way to achieve professional status. Both Florence Nightingale and Eva Luckes were opposed to registration on the grounds that the essential qualities of a good nurse would be subordinated to theory and exams. The BNA applied in 1891 to the Board of Trade to become a public company, but failed after a campaign organised by the anti-registrationists. In 1892, the BNA successfully applied for a Royal Charter of Incorporation, although the Privy Council watered down the charter by not including the power to maintain a register. State registration of nurses was not achieved until 1919.

Critics
As well as campaigning against registration, Eva Luckes found herself under attack from those who criticised her method of management. Her critics complained of the long hours and heavy responsibilities she expected from probationers.  The hours were demanding: 7 a.m. – 9 p.m., with half an hour for lunch and the pay was £10 a year. They disliked her two (rather than three) year training course and her opposition to nurse registration.  In 1890–91 she was called before a House of Lords Select committee set up to investigate the efficiency of metropolitan hospitals. Many charges from other witnesses were made against her department. The Select Committee made its report in 1892 and found not only the charges to be unsubstantiated, but that the majority of the allegations were exaggerated. Her achievements were undeniable, however, and she trained nurses who taught others all over the world, including Edith Cavell. She trained over 470 matrons during her tenure, including Annie Sophia Jane McIntosh, a Matron of St Bartholomew's Hospital, three Military Matron's in Chief: Ethel Hope Becher, Emma Maud McCarthy and Sarah Oram.

Luckes was decorated a number of times during her career, including the RRC, CBE and Lady of Grace Order of St. John medals.

The 'Matron Maker' 
Luckes was referred to by her friend and mentor Florence Nightingale as 'Matron of Matrons' and on her death as a Matron Maker. She trained over 470 matrons during her tenure, including, Annie McIntosh a Matron of St Bartholomew's Hospital, Dame Rosalind Paget, and three Military Matron's in Chief: Ethel Hope Becher, Emma Maud McCarthy and Sarah Oram.

Later life and death
As time progressed, Luckes' health deteriorated. She suffered from arthritis, diabetes and cataracts.

During the final years of her life her mobility was impaired and she took to using a bath-chair. By 1919, she became acutely ill and was nursed by Sisters from the hospital. She died on 16 February 1919, having been Matron of The London for 39 years. She was cremated and her ashes laid to rest behind a plaque on the north side of St Philip's Church, now the Medical School Library.

Publications
Matron Luckes published her lectures in book form in 1884, General Nursing.

A Second Edition was published in 1898, "entirely rewritten and taken out of lecture form". In its Preface she wrote eloquently of the importance of balance between character and technical knowledge in a good nurse. She ends, 'There are many belonging to us of whom we can say with just pride, "They help all with whom they come into contact – not because they can produce any number of Certificates, but because they love so much!”’.

A Ninth Edition was published in 1914. In its Introduction she wrote, ‘….if a Nurse is to be worthy of her calling, her work must be inspired with the right spirit of Nursing, i.e. of active sympathy with suffering, manifested by unwearied kindness and unselfish devotion to the patients entrusted to her care'. These words give us some idea of her approach to her life and work and why she opposed the campaign for a Registration Scheme. There is more in the same vein. Anyone who has interest or influence in the strategy of nurse training and discipline might find value in reading, and perhaps quoting, these introductions.

The book was widely used as a teaching aid and reference book by nurses.

She also produced a volume called Hospital Sisters and their Duties, which ran to 4 editions. Both books were a great success.

Honours
Matron Luckes's achievements were recognised by: Commander of the Order of the British Empire, Royal Red Cross and
Lady of Grace of the Order of St. John of Jerusalem in England.

Portrayals
Matron Luckes is played by Cherie Lunghi in the BBC series Casualty 1906, Casualty 1907 and Casualty 1909.

Matron Luckes appears as a supporting character in the opera Joseph Merrick, the Elephant Man by Laurent Petitgirard.

References

Further reading

Anthony, Grainne (2011), ‘Distinctness of Idea and Firmness of Purpose. The Career of Eva Luckes; A Victorian Hospital Matron.’ (Unpublished Master of Arts dissertation, London Metropolitan University, 2011).
MacEwan, Margaret. Eva C.E. Luckes, Matron, The London Hospital 1880–1919. London 1958.
McDonald, Lynn. "Eva Charlotte Luckes," in Lynn McDonald, ed., Florence Nightingale on Extending Nursing. Waterloo ON: Wilfrid Laurier University Press 2009:912-13.
"State Registration of Nurses," in Florence Nightingale: The Nightingale School 515-74.
McGann, Susan. "Eva Luckes, A Great Maker of Matrons," The Battle of the Nurses: A Study of Eight Women who influenced the Development of Professional Nursing, 1880–1930. London: Scutari 1992:9–34.

A volume of letters from Luckes to Nightingale, and Nightingale's notes from their meetings, is at the British Library (Mss 47746). Luckes's letters to her are at the Archives of the Royal London Hospital, Whitechapel ( PP/Luc/1).

 Rogers, Sarah (2022). 'A Maker of Matrons’? A study of Eva Lückes’s influence on a generation of nurse leaders:1880–1919' (Unpublished PhD thesis, University of Huddersfield, April 2022)

External links
 The Royal London Hospital Museum
 Barts and The Royal London History of Medicine, 1880
 English Heritage, Tredegar House
 English Heritage, Women and Healthcare
 The National Archive
 Doctors Independent Network, Edith Cavell
 publications by Miss Eva Luckes at the internet archive 

1854 births
1919 deaths
Nurses from London
People from Exeter in health professions
People from Newnham on Severn
Members of the Royal Red Cross